The open metering system of the Open Metering System Group e.V. stands for a manufacturer- and media-independent standardization for Meter-Bus (M-Bus) based communication between utility meters (electricity, gas, water, thermal energy), submetering (cold/hot water, thermal energy, heat cost allocators), and systems in the field of smart meters.

Background
In response to Directive 2006/32/EC on energy end-use efficiency and energy services of the European Union (in particular Article 13 of the Directive), several German multi-utility-companies (public utility offering more than only one type of supply like electricity, gas, water and district heating) joined and asked international manufacturers of meters intended for billing to create a common standard. The goal was to have meters with standardized communication interfaces and systems in the future. On the manufacturer side, members of the technical associations FIGAWA (German Association for Gas and Water), KNX and ZVEI (German Electrical and Electronics Industry Association) came together and, on the basis of the European Meter-Bus standard (EN 13757 Part 1 to Part 7), and the Dutch NTA 8130, have made joint specifications that guarantee manufacturer-independent interoperability.

The Open Metering System Specification
Several working groups – first in the Open Metering System initiative, since 2015 within the Open Metering System Group e. V. – have checked the application of existing standards for interoperable communication of measurement systems since May 2007 and developed additions and specifications. For the data transmission defined as primary communication between the actual meters and a gateway (e.g. a Smart Meter Gateway), the EN 13757-x series of standards has been identified as the currently applicable communication standard. This series of standards describes the M-Bus both as a physical interface, wired and wireless, as well as the data protocol. Both the OMS specification and the KNX standard use the EN 13757-4 standard for wireless communication. This means that both measurement data and data from the field of building automation can be transferred via the same system.

Wide area communication is not the focus of the Open Metering System specification. This is solved with proven Internet standards, whereby the transmission should be independent of the physical medium as long as the necessary security mechanisms are observed.

For data visualization (consumer display), the connection of the building automation at the end customer, and for future services (e.g. tariff or load management) devices are used that work according to the popular KNX standard (ISO/IEC 14543-3 = EN 50090).

In the specification work, European concerns were also considered. On the basis of Mandate M/441 of the European Commission, smart metering should function with an open architecture including communication protocols that enable interoperability. For this purpose, the OMS-Group cooperated with KEMA (now DNV) for harmonization with the Dutch regulations NTA 8130/DSMR.

The requirements for data security and access protection were considered as a decisive prerequisite for the acceptance of intelligent metering systems. A device-specific encryption of the consumption data on the basis of common algorithms (AES 128) is part of the OMS specification.

Compliance with the Open Metering System specification can be checked using the OMS test specification and the OMS conformance test tool. The actual proof of OMS conformity is provided by checking the device through an independent testing institute and having issued a certificate by an independent certification body.

Standardization
The outcoming results have been brought into European via the Technical Committee CEN/TC 294 since 2009, which maintains and develops the EN 13757 series of standards. This means that essential components of the OMS specification have been incorporated into updated European Standards. The standards or the published draft standards are available to everyone for purchase. The OMS specification documents are in English and available for free.

National access status

List of local grid operator policies for HAN (Home Area Network) remote reading. This gives an overview how energy savings and efficiency goals can be implemented in practice under local legislation and network operator policies. Energy consumption and savings are also important part of today's home automation integration which are able to visualize statistics in user interfaces.

EU directive 2019/944 says that consumer is entitled to connect own devices to the smart meter and receive metering information in real-time

See also

 Smart meter
 DLMS
 OpenHAN
 Power line communication
 Meter-Bus
 Electricity meter - Communication

References

External links
oms-group.org Documents of Open Metering System Specification by OMS-Group
figawa.de Homepage of one of the carrier assoziation of the OMS-group
knx.org Homepage of one of the carrier assoziation of the OMS-group
de.wikipedia.org - Smart Meter Gateway
jensd.be - Read data from the Belgian digital meter through the P1 port

Measuring instruments
Metrology